Adalagere  is a village in the southern state of Karnataka, India. It is located in the Gubbi taluk of Tumkur district in Karnataka only 110 km away from Bangalore.

See also
 Tumkur
 Districts of Karnataka

References

External links
 http://Tumkur.nic.in/

Villages in Tumkur district